, also known as  and Marginal (in Astral Project), was a Japanese manga writer.

In 1986 he completed his first major works in collaboration with Akyo Makata in Ahomansu and Meisouou Boodaa. Afterwards, Tsuchiya collaborated with draftsman Kaiji Kawaguchi (Zipang, Spirit of The Sun) for the title, Tokishozo Disturbs and Losses.

He also collaborated with Takashi Imashiro for the manga Takopon. He has collaborated with manga artist Nobuaki Minegishi for the manga Old Boy, upon which Park Chan-wook's 2003 film Oldboy is based.

Tsuchiya died on January 7, 2018.

Works
 Old Boy (1996–1998)
 Astral Project (2005–2007)
 Reverse Edge: Ōkawabata Tanteisha (2008–2018; his death) (as Yuuhou Hijikata)

See also
A Homansu, a film based on his comic.

References

External links
  (as Marley Carib) 
 Garon Tsuchiya manga, Marley Carib manga, at Media Arts Database 

1947 births
2018 deaths
Manga artists from Tokyo